Blushing Charlie is a 1970 Swedish drama film directed by Vilgot Sjöman. It was entered into the 21st Berlin International Film Festival.

Cast
 Bernt Lundquist - Karl-Inge 'Charlie' Svensson
 Solveig Ternström - Pia Bergström
 Tomas Bolme - PV
 Inger Liljefors - Anita
 Christer Boustedt - Krille
 Lasse Werner - Lasse
 Gösta Wälivaara - Gösta
 Janne 'Loffe' Carlsson - Janne (as Janne Carlsson)
 Bertil Norström - Charlie's manager
 Olle Andersson - Clerk
 Janet Pettersson - Taxen
 Jan Nygren - Lennart
 Lilian Johansson - Ärtan
 Lisbeth Zachrisson - Bunny
 Marianne Sydow

References

External links
 
 

1970 films
1970s Swedish-language films
1970 drama films
Films directed by Vilgot Sjöman
Swedish drama films
1970s Swedish films